A leap year starting on Wednesday is any year with 366 days (i.e. it includes 29 February) that begins on Wednesday 1 January and ends on Thursday 31 December. Its dominical letters hence are ED. The most recent year of such kind was 2020 and the next one will be 2048 in the Gregorian calendar, or likewise, 2004 and 2032 in the obsolete Julian calendar, see below for more.

Any leap year that starts on Monday, Wednesday or Thursday has two Friday the 13ths: those two in this leap year occur in March and November. Common years starting on Thursday share this characteristic, but also have another in February.

In this leap year, Martin Luther King Jr. Day is on January 20, Valentine’s Day is on a Friday, President's Day is on February 17, the leap day is on a Saturday, Saint Patrick’s Day is on a Tuesday, Memorial Day is on its earliest possible date, May 25, Juneteenth is on a Friday, U.S. Independence Day is on a Saturday, Labor Day is on its latest possible date, September 7, Halloween is on a Saturday, Thanksgiving is on November 26, and Christmas is on a Friday. Also like a common year starting on Thursday, this leap year is the only one where Memorial Day and Labor Day are not 14 weeks (98 days) apart: they are 15 weeks (105 days) apart in this leap year.

Calendars

Applicable years

Gregorian Calendar
Leap years that begin on Wednesday, like those that start on Tuesday, occur at a rate of approximately 14.43% (14 out of 97) of all total leap years in a 400-year cycle of the Gregorian calendar. Their overall occurrence is thus 3.5% (14 out of 400).

For this kind of year, the corresponding ISO year has 53 weeks.

400 year cycle

century 1: 20, 48, 76

century 2: 116, 144, 172

century 3: 212, 240, 268, 296

century 4: 308, 336, 364, 392

Julian Calendar
Like all leap year types, the one starting with 1 January on a Wednesday occurs exactly once in a 28-year cycle in the Julian calendar, i.e. in 3.57% of years. As the Julian calendar repeats after 28 years that means it will also repeat after 700 years, i.e. 25 cycles. The year's position in the cycle is given by the formula ((year + 8) mod 28) + 1).

References

Gregorian calendar
Wednesday